The wedding of Willem-Alexander, Prince of Orange, and Máxima Zorreguieta Cerruti took place on 2 February 2002 at the Nieuwe Kerk, Amsterdam. Willem-Alexander and Máxima became king and queen on 30 April 2013 after the abdication of his mother, Beatrix.

Engagement
Willem-Alexander, Prince of Orange, eldest son and heir of Queen Beatrix and Prince Claus, met Argentine-born Máxima Zorreguieta Cerruti at the Seville Fair in April 1999. He did not introduce himself as a prince, and when she later found out, she thought he was joking. Two weeks later, they met again in New York, where Máxima was working as a banker for Kleinwort Benson. She did not meet his parents, Queen Beatrix and Prince Claus, for some time.

As speed skating is one of the most popular sports, and Willem-Alexander is a good speed skater, he proposed to Máxima on the ice on skates. A week earlier, Willem-Alexander already told his mother and Prime Minister Wim Kok that he would propose to Máxima soon. He endlessly practiced the question, he told in an interview later. With hidden champagne and red roses by the pond of Huis ten Bosch, he invited Máxima to go ice skating. While on the ice of the pond he proposed her in English, "to make sure she would understand it". Máxima was surprised but answered directly with "yes".

The intention was that the intended marriage remained a secret, so as not to get in the way of Willem-Alexander's brother Constantijn and Laurentien Brinkhorst, who would marry in May. Ultimately, it was too difficult to keep secret, so on 30 March 2001, Queen Beatrix announced her eldest son's engagement. On 21 May 2001, the bill seeking consent for the marriage was introduced in parliament. On 7 January 2002, the ondertrouw was published.

Zorreguieta became a naturalized Dutch citizen, though she did not convert from Roman Catholicism. It was announced any children born of the marriage would be titled Prince/Princess of the Netherlands and Prince/Princess of Orange-Nassau, with the style of Royal Highness.

Controversy
During the National Reorganization Process, Argentina's most recent dictatorship, Jorge Zorreguieta, Máxima's father, served as Secretary of Agriculture, Livestock, and Fisheries. During this regime, an estimated 10,000–30,000 people were kidnapped and murdered during this and subsequent military regimes before democracy was restored to Argentina in 1983. Zorreguieta claimed he was unaware of the Dirty War while he was a cabinet minister.

At the request of the States General, Michiel Baud, a Dutch professor in Latin American studies, carried out an inquiry into the involvement of Zorreguieta in the Dirty War. Baud determined that Máxima's father had not been directly involved in any of the numerous atrocities that took place during that period. However, Baud also concluded that Zorreguieta was almost certainly aware of them; in Baud's view, it was highly unlikely that a cabinet minister would not have known about them.

Jorge Zorreguieta's presence at the wedding was debated for months. It was eventually concluded he would not attend. In solidarity, her mother chose not to attend.

Pre-wedding celebrations
On 31 January, Queen Beatrix's 64th birthday, there was a black-tie dinner and ball at the Royal Palace of Amsterdam for 500 guests to celebrate the impending wedding and The Queen's birthday.

The day before the wedding, there was a lunch and concert at the Royal Concertgebouw attended by 1,600 guests. That evening, the couple attend an event organized by the National Orange Committee and the municipality of Amsterdam in the Amsterdam ArenA. About 50,000 people from every Dutch municipality were invited.

Wedding

Civil ceremony
Per Dutch law, the couple were first required to be married in a civil ceremony. This was performed by Job Cohen, Mayor of Amsterdam, at the Beurs van Berlage prior to the religious ceremony. The civil ceremony was attended by friends and family of the couple, dignitaries and some 600 invited guests.

Witnesses for the Prince of Orange were his brother, Prince Constantijn, and friends Marc ter Haar and Frank Houben. Witnesses for Zorreguieta Cerruti were her new mother-in-law, Queen Beatrix, her aunt, Marcela Cerruti Carricart, and her brother, Martín Zorreguieta Cerruti.

Religious ceremony
The Dutch Reformed Church ceremony took place in the Nieuwe Kerk, Amsterdam. The Reverend Carel ter Linden, Minister Emeritus of the Kloosterkerk, The Hague, officiated.

Music 
Music during the service was provided by Bernard Winsemius, organist, Miranda van Kralingen, soprano, the Nederlands Kamerkoor and the Royal Concertgebouw Orchestra, conducted by Ed Spanjaard.

Prior to the service, pieces by Böhm, Bach and Scheidemann were played on the organ. The bride and groom entered the church together to Entrata Festiva, which was composed by Dutch composer Jurriaan Andriessen for the wedding of Prince Willem-Alexander's parents in 1966. Throughout the service, a number of Dutch hymns were sung. Kyrie from Mozart's Mass in C major, K. 337 "Solemnis" and Schubert's Ave Maria were also performed. The recessional was "Hallelujah" from Handel's Messiah.

In honour of the bride's parents, who were absent, Adiós Nonino, an Argentine tango by Astor Piazzolla was played.

Attendants
The bride was attended by four adult bridesmaids:
 Valeria Delger, the bride's childhood friend
 Juliana Guillermo, the groom's maternal first cousin
 Baroness Theresa von der Recke, the groom's paternal first cousin
 Inés Zorreguieta, the bride's sister

Two child bridesmaids:
 Princess Pauline of Sayn-Wittgenstein-Hohenstein
 Countess Leonie of Waldburg-Zeil-Hohenems

Four pageboys:
 Jonkheer Paulo Alting von Geusau
 Baron Johann-Casper von dem Bussche-Haddenhausen     
 Mr Alexandre Friling
 Mr Floris ter Haar

Clothing
The bride wore a gown of ivory mikado silk, with a cowl neckline, three-quarter sleeves and a five-metre-long train designed and created by Valentino. The skirt was inset with panels of embroidered lace at the sides, flaring slightly from a close-fitting empire-line bodice. Her veil, also a Valentino creation, was of silk tulle and hand-embroidered with a flower and tendril motifs. The court jeweller adapted the Dutch Pearl Button Tiara by exchanging the pearl buttons with five diamond stars which belonged to Queen Emma. The bride carried a cascading bouquet of white roses, gardenias, lilies of the valley and two kinds of foliage.

The Prince wore the full dress uniform of a captain in the Royal Netherlands Navy. He wore the riband and star of a Knight Grand Gross of the Order of the Netherlands Lion, the star of a Knight of the Order of the Gold Lion of the House of Nassau, the Officers' Cross and the Queen Beatrix Inauguration Medal, 1980.

Procession and reception
After the service, the bride and groom drove through the Nieuwezijds Voorburgwal, Spui, Singel, Muntplein and the Rokin in the Golden Coach. The couple then returned to the Royal Palace and appeared on the balcony above Dam Square. They then proceeded to a luncheon reception.

Guests

Relatives of the groom

House of Orange-Nassau
 The Queen and The Prince Consort, the groom's parents
 Prince Friso, the groom's brother
 Prince Constantijn and Princess Laurentien, the groom's brother and sister-in-law
 Prince Bernhard, the groom's maternal grandfather
 Princess Irene, the groom's maternal aunt
 Prince Carlos, the groom's first cousin
 Prince Jaime, the groom's first cousin
 Princess Carolina, the groom's first cousin
 Princess Margriet and Mr Pieter van Vollenhoven, the groom's maternal uncle and aunt
 Prince Maurits and Princess Marilène of Orange-Nassau, van Vollenhoven, the groom's first cousin and his wife
 Prince Bernhard and Princess Annette of Orange-Nassau, van Vollenhoven, the groom's first cousin and his wife
 Prince Pieter-Christiaan of Orange-Nassau, van Vollenhoven, the groom's first cousin
 Prince Floris of Orange-Nassau, van Vollenhoven, the groom's first cousin
 Princess Christina, the groom's maternal aunt
 Mr Bernardo Guillermo, the groom's first cousin 
 Mr Nicolás Guillermo, the groom's first cousin 
 Miss Juliana Guillermo, the groom's first cousin (bridesmaid)

House of Amsberg
 Jonkvrouw Sigrid Jencquel, the groom's paternal aunt
 Mr and Mrs Joachim Jencquel, the groom's first cousin and his wife
 Baroness Theda and Baron Karl von Friesen, the groom's paternal aunt and uncle
 Baron Alexander von Friesen, the groom's first cousin
 Baroness Renate von Friesen, the groom's first cousin
 Baroness Isabell von Friesen, the groom's first cousin
 Baroness Christina and Baron Hans von der Recke, the groom's paternal aunt and uncle
 Baroness Katinka von der Recke, the groom's first cousin
 Baroness Sophie von der Recke, the groom's first cousin
 Baroness Theresa von der Recke, the groom's first cousin (bridesmaid)

Relatives of the bride
Due to the controversy surrounding her father's alleged involvement in Argentina's Dirty War, the bride's father, Jorge Zorreguieta, was not invited. In solidarity with her husband, the bride's mother, María del Carmen Cerruti Carricart, chose not to attend.
 Mr and Mrs Martín Zorreguieta Cerruti, the bride's brother and sister-in-law
 Mr Juan Zorreguieta Cerruti, the bride's brother
 Miss Inés Zorreguieta Cerruti, the bride's sister (bridesmaid)
 Mrs María and Mr Adrián Vojnov, the bride's half-sister and brother-in-law
 Miss Ángeles Zorreguieta López Gil, the bride's half-sister
 Mrs Dolores and Mr Harmond Grad Lewis, the bride's half-sister and brother-in-law
 Mrs Marcela Cerruti Carricart, the bride's maternal aunt

Foreign royal guests

Members of reigning royal houses
  The King and Queen of the Belgians
  The Duke and Duchess of Brabant
  Princess Astrid and Prince Lorenz of Belgium
  Prince Laurent of Belgium and Miss Claire Coombs
  The Queen of Denmark
  The Crown Prince of Denmark
  The Crown Prince of Japan (representing the Emperor of Japan)
  Queen Noor of Jordan (representing the King of Jordan)
  Prince Hassan bin Talal and Princess Sarvath al-Hassan of Jordan
  Princess Sumaya bint Hassan of Jordan and Mr Nasser Judeh
  Princess Badiya bint Hassan of Jordan
  Prince Rashid bin Hassan of Jordan
  The Hereditary Prince and Hereditary Princess of Liechtenstein (representing the Prince of Liechtenstein)
  The Grand Duke and Grand Duchess of Luxembourg
  The Hereditary Grand Duke of Luxembourg
  Grand Duke Jean and Grand Duchess Joséphine Charlotte of Luxembourg
  Prince Guillaume and Princess Sibilla of Luxembourg
  The Hereditary Prince of Monaco (representing the Prince of Monaco)
  Prince Moulay Rachid of Morocco (representing the King of Morocco)
  The King and Queen of Norway
  Princess Märtha Louise of Norway and Mr Ari Behn
  The Crown Prince and Crown Princess of Norway
  The Queen of Spain (representing the King of Spain)
  The Duchess and Duke of Palma de Mallorca
  The Prince of Asturias
  The King and Queen of Sweden
  The Crown Princess of Sweden
  The Duke of Värmland
  The Duchess of Hälsingland and Gästrikland
  The Prince of Wales (representing the Queen of the United Kingdom and Commonwealth Realms)
  The Earl and Countess of Wessex

Members of non-reigning royal houses
 The Aga Khan and Begum Aga Khan
 The Prince and Princess of Turnovo
 King Constantine II and Queen Anne-Marie of the Hellenes
 Crown Prince and Crown Princess Pavlos of Greece
 Prince Nikolaos of Greece and Denmark
 The Prince and Princess of Hanover
 Prince Philipp of Hesse
 The Duke of Parma, ex-husband of the groom's maternal aunt
 The Prince and Princess of Sayn-Wittgenstein-Berleburg
 The Hereditary Prince of Sayn-Wittgenstein-Berleburg
 Princess Alexandra, Countess of Pfeil und Klein-Ellguth and Count Jefferson von Pfeil und Klein-Ellguth
 Princess Nathalie of Sayn-Wittgenstein-Berleburg
 The Prince and Princess of Sayn-Wittgenstein-Sayn
 The Prince and Princess of Waldeck and Pyrmont

Politicians

Dutch politicians
 Wim Kok, Prime Minister
 Gerrit Braks, President of the Senate
 Jeltje van Nieuwenhoven, Speaker of the House of Representatives 
 Job Cohen, Mayor of Amsterdam
 Wim Deetman, Mayor of The Hague
 Ivo Opstelten, Mayor of Rotterdam
 A. H. Brouwer-Korf, Mayor of Utrecht

Foreign politicians
  Nane and Kofi Annan, Secretary-General of the United Nations and his wife
  Nelson Mandela and Graça Machel, former President of South Africa and his wife
  James Wolfensohn, President of the World Bank Group

Other notable guests
 Valentino Garavani, designer of the bride's gown

Aftermath
Per a  decree issued on 25 January 2002, upon the solemnization of marriage, Máxima became formally titled "Her Royal Highness Princess Máxima of the Netherlands, Princess of Orange-Nassau, Mrs. van Amsberg." She did not, however, become Princess consort of Orange.

The newlyweds honeymooned in St. Moritz, after a brief layover in London to visit with the bride's parents. They then proceeded to Argentina and New Zealand.

The couple have three children, Catharina-Amalia, Alexia and Ariane.

References

Netherlands
2002 in the Netherlands
Events in Amsterdam
Dutch monarchy
February 2002 events in Europe
Netherlands
2000s in Amsterdam